Echium aculeatum is a species of flowering plant of the family Boraginaceae. It is endemic to the Canary Islands, where it occurs on the islands El Hierro, La Palma, La Gomera and Tenerife. Its name in Spanish is ajinajo.

It is a branched shrub with thorny leaves and white flowers.

References

aculeatum
Endemic flora of the Canary Islands
Garden plants of Africa